This is a chronological list of Acts passed by the Parliament of Sri Lanka, 2010–present:

Summary

2010–present

13th Parliament

2010

14th Parliament

2010

2011

2012

2013

2014

2015

15th Parliament

2015

2016

2017

References

External links
 Department of Government Printing
 Laws of Sri Lanka